People to People International (PTPI) is a program established on September 11, 1956, by President Dwight D. Eisenhower, as part of the United States Information Agency. After President Eisenhower left the office of President in 1961, he arranged to have the organization privatized as a non-governmental organization and arranged for People to People to become a not-for-profit Missouri corporation now known as People to People International. President Eisenhower was Chairman of the Board of Trustees and recognized as the founder of the not-for-profit organization.  It is incorporated as a not-for-profit organization in the state of Missouri and qualifies for exemption from income tax under the Internal Revenue Code 501(c)(3). PTPI is funded through program fees, membership dues and donations.

Among the early leaders working with President Eisenhower were Joyce C. Hall, the founder of Hallmark Cards, Inc., Walt Disney, Bob Hope and approximately 100 other remarkable individuals from industry, academia and the arts. Charles M. Schulz, creator of the Peanuts comic strip, contributed three pieces of artwork for PTPI Worldwide Conferences.

On June 22, 2006, People to People was the first organization awarded the Cavaliere per la Pace (Knight of Peace Award).  Prior to People to People, recipients of this award had always been individuals. Previous honorees include Mother Teresa, Mikhail Gorbachev and Pope John Paul II. Since its inception, eight U.S. Presidents have served as the honorary chairman of People to People International.

People to People International filed for bankruptcy on March 22, 2022, in Missouri Western Bankruptcy court.

Other PTPI programs
Other People to People International programs include: Educational and Humanitarian Initiatives adult travel programs, the EXPERIENCE program (an annual student travel program incorporating service work), Peace Camp (free, international travel program for students with an emphasis on peace education), the Global Landmine Initiative (working with the HALO Trust), the School and Classroom Program (an international classroom-based pen pal program), & also Community, University, Student Chapters all over the world. Also the Global Youth Forum known as the GYF, open to 13- to 18-year-olds all over the world every November.

The last few years the Global Youth Forums have been held in the following cities:

In early 2004, actor Gary Sinise and author Laura Hillenbrand founded Operation Iraqi Children and joined in partnership with People to People International in order to provide a way for concerned Americans to reach out to the war-stricken children of Iraq by supporting troops and their efforts to assist them. In 2009, the mission of the program was expanded to include children in areas all over the world served by American troops and the name of the program was changed to Operation International Children. The Operation International Children program announced its closing in April 2013. The final shipment to Kuwait was sent in June 2013.

PTPI is a partner of Global Youth Service Day.

People to People International has a European extension office in Berlin, Germany. There was previously an office in Cairo, Egypt.

References

External links
 
 Documents relating to People to People International at the Dwight D. Eisenhower Presidential Library
 Operation International Children Website
 People to People International on Facebook
 People to People Ambassador Programs website
 People to People Bankruptcy

Presidency of Dwight D. Eisenhower
Organizations based in Missouri
501(c)(3) organizations
1956 establishments in the United States
Organizations established in 1956